Haft Awrang (meaning "Seven Thrones") by the Persian poet Jami is a classic of Persian literature composed some time between 1468 and 1485. Jami completed the work as seven books following a masnavi format:

 "Selselat adh-dhahab" ("Chain of Gold"): a collection of didactic anecdotes 
 "Yusof-o Zulaikhā" ("Joseph and Zulaikha"): the romance of Joseph and Zulaikha, wife of Potiphar based on the Islamic traditions.
 "Sabhat al-abrār" ("Rosary of the Pious"): another collection of didactic anecdotes 
 "Salaman-o Absāl" (Salaman and Absal): A doomed romance between a prince and his nursemaid. The original story is Greek, translated in the early Islamic times to Arabic by Ibn Hunain and then rendered into Persian poem by Jami. Dehkhoda suggests this story might have an Israelite origin.
 "Tohfat ol-ahrār ("Gift of the Free")
 "Layli-o Majnun" ("Layla and Majnun")
 "Kheradnāma-i Eskandari" ("Alexander's Book of Wisdom") account of events leading up to Alexander's death.

The term Haft Awrang itself is a reference to the seven stars that form the Big Dipper (the Plough or ).

Religion, philosophy, and ethics of Sufi origin lie at the root of all seven masnavis.

Freer Jami
Between 1556 and 1565, while he was governing Mashad, Prince Sultan Ibrahim Mirza, nephew and son-in-law of Shah Tahmasp I, commissioned his own atelier of painters and calligraphers to create a sumptuous illustrated version of the Haft Awrang, producing one of the undoubted masterpieces of the Persian miniature, now in the Freer Gallery of Art, and known as the Freer Jami.

References
  hardback:

External links
Explore the Freer Jami

15th-century books
Persian poems
Persian words and phrases